Brogne Abbey, also known as Saint-Gerard Abbey, was a Benedictine abbey founded in the early 10th century by Gerard of Brogne in the village of Brogne (now the Saint-Gérard subdivision of Mettet, Wallonia).

Gerard founded the abbey on his own land, with the blessing of  Stephen of Liège (died 920), and obtained a relic of St Eugenius from the abbot of Saint-Denis. A charter of 923 granted land in Hesbaye to the monastery.

In 992 Otto III visited the abbey together with Notker of Liège and confirmed its independence and privileges. In 1183 Pope Lucius III confirmed the abbey in all its possessions.

In 1566 the revenues of the abbacy were assigned to the recently founded Diocese of Namur by a bull of Pope Pius IV. Thereafter the monastery was governed by a prior on behalf of the bishop of Namur. In 1656 the monastery was incorporated into the Bursfelde Congregation. Just which revenues were due to the bishop remained subject to dispute, petitions and sometimes litigation until the abbey was suppressed in 1796.

The buildings of the former monastery were acquired by the municipality of Mettet in 1974, and were listed as built heritage in 1995. Since 2013 they have housed a microbrewery, and since 2015 a centre for viticulture.

Abbots

Gerard of Brogne (died 959)
Heribert
Guinebald
Reiner
Gonther
Boso (died 1085)
Guerimond
Thomas 
Arnold (died 1106)
Stephen (died 1114)
Ebroin (died 1140)
Gerard (died 1156)
Godfrey (died 1161)
Libuin (died 1185)
Lambert (died 1234)
Arnold (died 1192)
Robert (died 1221/22)
Thomas (died 1268)
Gerard (died 1291)
Lambert (died 1293)
Baldwin of Riwenchies (died 1301)
Thomas de Hanèche (died 1310)
Gerard (died 1313)
Alard (died 1353)
Henri de Falize (died 1380)
Jean Buffetial (died 1400)
Walter de Falize
Jean de Liernu (died 1433)
Nicolas de Lesves (died 1448)
Nicolas Cardin (died 1452)
Guillaume de Graux (died 1483)
Jacques Le Tourier (died 1503)
Guillaume de Beez (died 1507)
Thomas Badry (resigned 1512; died 1516)
Guillaume Caulier (died 1550)
Benoît de Mailly (died 1564)
Thereafter the bishops of Namur held the abbacy in commendam.

References

Christian monasteries in Namur (province)
10th-century establishments in the Holy Roman Empire
1796 disestablishments in the Southern Netherlands
Ruined abbeys and monasteries
Benedictine monasteries in Belgium
Christian monasteries established in the 10th century